Francesco Parisi (born May 31, 1962) is a legal scholar and economist, working primarily in the United States and Italy. He is the Oppenheimer Wolff & Donnelly Professor of Law at the University of Minnesota Law School and Distinguished Professor of Economics at the University of Bologna. Parisi specializes in the economic analysis of law.   His research uses formal models and technical results in areas from international law to behavioral law and economics to tort law.

Education

Parisi earned his law degree at the University of Rome in 1985. He later studied at the University of California, Berkeley, where he obtained an LL.M. (1988) and J.S.D. (1990). He taught briefly at Louisiana State University Law Center before moving to George Mason University School of Law. While an associate professor at George Mason, Parisi obtained an M.A. in economics at Berkeley, later earning a Ph.D. in economics from George Mason University.

Career

After lecturing briefly at University of California, Berkeley (1990–91) and Louisiana State University Law Center (1991–93), Parisi was a member of the faculty of George Mason University School of Law from 1993 to 2006. The University of Minnesota Law School recruited Parisi in 2006.

At the University of Minnesota, Parisi has taught methodological courses in law and economics, including seminars in game theory, public choice, and social choice. Since 2002, Parisi has split his time between teaching in the United States and Italy. He taught at the University of Milan from 2002 to 2006 and has taught at the University of Bologna since 2006, where he remains a member of the economics faculty.

Parisi's has written on a number of legal topics. His early writings included historical and comparative analyses of the evolution of the law; more recent research has been entirely in the domain of law and economics. Parisi's work is often technical, relying on mathematical models and formal proofs to establish a practical point about the incentive structure of the law. In particular, his work often focuses on logical symmetries, secondary effects, and evolutionary changes in the law.

Parisi is a founding member of both the American Law & Economics Association and Italian Society for Law and Economics. He has served as editor-in-chief of the Review of Law and Economics, and is general editor (with Richard Posner) of the reference series Economic Approaches to Law and Research Handbooks in Law and Economics.

In 2019, the European Association of Law and Economics awarded Parisi the prestigious EALE Award for lifetime achievement. Parisi was the third American, after Robert Cooter and Guido Calabresi to receive the EALE Award.

Selected writings

Books

Articles

References

1962 births
American legal scholars
Italian legal scholars
American legal writers
Italian jurists
American people of Italian descent
UC Berkeley College of Natural Resources alumni
UC Berkeley School of Law alumni
George Mason University alumni
Law and economics
Living people
University of Minnesota Law School faculty